Dante Exum (born 13 July 1995) is an Australian professional basketball player for Partizan of the ABA League and the EuroLeague. He chose to bypass college and was ultimately selected by the Utah Jazz with the fifth overall pick in the 2014 NBA draft.

Exum competed at the 2020 Tokyo Olympics as part of the Australian men's basketball team. In the bronze playoff, he scored or assisted on 13 of Australia's points in the pivotal 20-8 run that turned a five-point lead into a 17-point advantage (105-88) with just over a minute remaining.

Early career
Exum was born in the Melbourne suburb of East Melbourne to American parents. He played for the Keilor Basketball Association as a junior, coached by Karish . and attended Lake Ginninderra Secondary College in Canberra in conjunction with the Australian Institute of Sport. He grew up also playing Australian rules football.

In April 2013, Exum participated in the Nike Hoop Summit for the World Select Team, where he recorded 16 points, three rebounds and two assists in a 112–98 win over the USA Junior Select Team. In October 2013, he graduated from Lake Ginninderra and had the option to enroll in college and play college basketball during the 2013–14 season, but he decided against it.

Exum competed for Lake Ginninderra in the Australian National High School Basketball Championships in December 2013, and helped them win the eventual title.

On 28 January 2014, it was announced that Exum signed with agents from Landmark Sports and that he would declare for the 2014 NBA draft.

Professional career

Utah Jazz (2014–2019)

Exum was selected by the Utah Jazz with the fifth overall pick in the 2014 NBA draft. He made his NBA debut in the Jazz's season opener on 29 October, scoring five points in 9½ minutes off the bench in a 104–93 loss to the Houston Rockets. On 22 January, he scored a career-high 15 points on five 3-pointers in a 101–99 win over the Milwaukee Bucks. On 1 April, he had a career-high 12 assists in a 98–84 win over the Denver Nuggets. He appeared in all 82 games (41 starts) as a rookie and averaged 4.8 points, 1.6 rebounds and 2.4 assists in 22.2 minutes. Exum became only the 10th rookie in Jazz history to play in all 82 games, scoring in double figures in 13 games and leading the team in assists 11 times. He helped the Jazz to a 24–17 record as a starter and was selected to compete in the 2015 Rising Stars Challenge during the NBA's All-Star Weekend in New York.

In August 2015, Exum sustained a tear of the anterior cruciate ligament (ACL) in his left knee while playing for Australia in Slovenia. He underwent surgery and subsequently missed the entire 2015–16 season.

Exum returned to action in the 2016–17 season. He played in 28 of the first 29 games of the season, but then sat out 10 of 11 games between 21 December and 10 January. On 11 March, he scored a career-high 22 points in a 112–104 loss to the Oklahoma City Thunder.

In October 2017, Exum underwent shoulder surgery. He made his first appearance of the season on 15 March 2018, finishing with 10 points in a 116–88 win over the Phoenix Suns. On 30 March 2018, he scored a season-high 21 points in a 107–97 win over the Memphis Grizzlies.

On 6 July 2018, Exum re-signed with the Jazz. On 27 December 2018, he scored a season-high 20 points in a 114–97 loss to the Philadelphia 76ers. Two days later, in his first start of the season, Exum had 13 points and a career-high 13 assists in a 129–97 victory over the New York Knicks. On 7 January 2019, he was ruled out for "a couple of weeks" due to an ankle sprain that he suffered two days earlier against the Detroit Pistons. His return was delayed after developing a bone bruise from his ankle sprain. He returned to action on 11 March against the Thunder after missing 25 games. Four days later however, he was ruled out indefinitely after sustaining a partially torn patellar tendon in his right knee.

Cleveland Cavaliers (2019–2021)
On 24 December 2019, Exum was traded, alongside two second-round picks, to the Cleveland Cavaliers in exchange for Jordan Clarkson.

On 16 January 2021, Exum was traded to the Houston Rockets in a multi-player, four-team deal with the Cleveland Cavaliers that sent James Harden to the Brooklyn Nets; the Cavaliers received Taurean Prince and Jarrett Allen in the deal. He did not appear in any games for Houston during his first season with them due to injury.

On 17 September 2021, Exum re-signed with the Rockets. However, he was waived on 16 October.

Barcelona (2021–2022)
On 7 December 2021, Exum signed with FC Barcelona of the Liga ACB and the EuroLeague.

Partizan NIS Belgrade (2022–present)
On 10 July 2022, Exum signed with Partizan NIS Belgrade of the ABA League and the EuroLeague.

NBA career statistics

Regular season

|-
| style="text-align:left;"|
| style="text-align:left;"|Utah
| style="background:#cfecec;"|   82* || 41 || 22.2 || .349 || .314 || .625 || 1.6 || 2.4 || .5 || .2 || 4.8
|-
| style="text-align:left;"|
| style="text-align:left;"|Utah
| 66 || 26 || 18.6 || .427 || .295 || .795 || 2.0 || 1.7 || .3 || .2 || 6.2
|-
| style="text-align:left;"|
| style="text-align:left;"|Utah
| 14 || 0 || 16.8 || .483 || .278 || .806 || 1.9 || 3.1 || .6 || .2 || 8.1
|-
| style="text-align:left;"|
| style="text-align:left;"|Utah
| 42 || 1 || 15.8 || .419 || .290 || .791 || 1.6 || 2.6 || .3 || .1 || 6.9
|-
| style="text-align:left;"|
| style="text-align:left;"|Utah
| 11 || 0 || 7.5 || .435 || .333 || 1.000 || 1.1 || .6 || .1 || .2 || 2.2
|-
| style="text-align:left;"|
| style="text-align:left;"|Cleveland
| 24 || 1 || 16.8 || .479 || .351 || .732 || 2.3 || 1.4 || .5 || .3 || 5.6
|-
| style="text-align:left;"|
| style="text-align:left;"|Cleveland
| 6 || 3 || 19.3 || .385 || .182 || .500 || 2.8 || 2.2 || .7 || .3 || 3.8
|- class="sortbottom"
| style="text-align:center;" colspan="2"|Career
| 245 || 72 || 18.6 || .407 || .305 || .764 || 1.8 || 2.1 || .4 || .2 || 5.7

Playoffs

|-
| style="text-align:left;"|2017
| style="text-align:left;"|Utah
| 7 || 0 || 12.0 || .407 || .333 || 1.000 || .9 || 1.3 || .7 || .0 || 4.6
|-
| style="text-align:left;"|2018
| style="text-align:left;"|Utah
| 10 || 0 || 11.4 || .488 || .286 || .750 || 1.4 || 1.0 || .1 || .1 || 5.1
|- class="sortbottom"
| align="center" colspan="2"|Career
| 17 || 0 || 11.6 || .456 || .316 || .833 || 1.2 || 1.1 || .4 || .1 || 4.9

National team career

Exum played for Australia's junior national team at the 2012 FIBA Under-17 World Cup, where he was named to the All-Tournament Team, as well as the 2013 FIBA Under-19 World Cup, where he was again named to the All-Tournament Team. 2013 also marked Exum's debut for the senior national team, playing against New Zealand at the 2013 FIBA Oceania Championship. In 2014, he played for Australia at the 2014 FIBA World Cup, where he averaged 2.7 points, 1.5 rebounds and 2.0 assists in six games.

Exum was selected for the Australian basketball team at the 2020 Tokyo Olympics.

Personal life
Exum has an older brother, Jamaar, and a twin sister, Tierra. His father, Cecil, played college basketball at the University of North Carolina and won an NCAA championship in 1982, a team which featured Michael Jordan and James Worthy. His mother also attended North Carolina. Cecil was drafted in 1984 by the Denver Nuggets, and later settled in Australia where he played in the National Basketball League for the North Melbourne Giants, Melbourne Tigers and Geelong Supercats. Exum is a passionate supporter of the Essendon Football Club, who compete in the Australian Football League. Exum wore Essendon-inspired shoes during the Rising Stars Challenge at the 2017 NBA All-Star Weekend.

References

External links

 Dante Exum at euroleague.net
 Dante Exum at FIBA.com
 

1995 births
Living people
2014 FIBA Basketball World Cup players
Australian expatriate basketball people in the United States
Australian expatriate basketball people in Spain
Australian expatriate basketball people in Serbia
Australian Institute of Sport basketball players
Australian men's basketball players
Australian people of African-American descent
Basketball players at the 2020 Summer Olympics
Basketball players from Melbourne
Cleveland Cavaliers players
Medalists at the 2020 Summer Olympics
National Basketball Association players from Australia
Olympic basketball players of Australia
Olympic bronze medalists for Australia
Olympic medalists in basketball
People educated at Lake Ginninderra College
Shooting guards
Small forwards
Utah Jazz draft picks
Utah Jazz players
FC Barcelona Bàsquet players
KK Partizan players